Gerson José Sodré (born 14 July 1957), known as Gerson Sodré, is a Brazilian retired footballer who played as a midfielder, and the current assistant manager of Portuguesa.

Playing career
Born in Itabuna, Bahia, Sodré represented Itabuna, América-RJ, Portuguesa, Guarani, Ceará, Ferroviária, América-SP, Bandeirante, CRB, Grêmio Maringá, Atlético Sorocaba and Uberlândia, retiring with the latter in 1994.

Post-playing career
Sodré acted as a player-manager with his last club Uberlândia, and was later appointed as a youth coach in another of his former clubs, Portuguesa. In 1999, he was named Alecrim manager, but returned to São Paulo shortly after, taking over União de Mogi's youth setup.

After another managerial jobs in the same state, Sodré worked exclusively as Estevam Soares' assistant, only stepping out of his role to manage CRB in 2006 and Sport Barueri in 2010. In 2012, he returned to Lusa and its youth setup, being appointed assistant of the main squad in the following year.

In 2014 Sodré was in charge of the club during a Série B match as an interim, being subsequently replaced by Marcelo Veiga.

Honours
Ceará
Campeonato Cearense: 1986, 1988
 
CRB
Campeonato Alagoano: 1992
 
Atlético Sorocaba
 Campeonato Paulista Série Extra: 1993

References

External links
Gerson Sodré at playmakerstats.com (English version of ogol.com.br)
Gerson Sodré coach profile at playmakerstats.com (English version of ogol.com.br)

1957 births
Living people
Sportspeople from Bahia
Brazilian footballers
Brazilian football managers
Association football midfielders
America Football Club (RJ) players
Associação Portuguesa de Desportos players
Guarani FC players
Ceará Sporting Club players
Associação Ferroviária de Esportes players
América Futebol Clube (SP) players
Clube de Regatas Brasil players
Clube Atlético Sorocaba players
Uberlândia Esporte Clube players
Clube de Regatas Brasil managers
Associação Portuguesa de Desportos managers